The 1968 NAIA football season was the 13th season of college football sponsored by the NAIA.

The season was played from August to November 1968, culminating in the 1968 NAIA Championship Bowl, played this year on December 14, 1968 in Montgomery, Alabama.

Troy State defeated  in the Championship Bowl, 43–35, to win their first NAIA national title.

Conference realignment

Conference changes
 This was the final season of play for the Central Intercollegiate Conference. After the end of play, the remaining members of the conference, four from Kansas and one from Nebraska, would subsequently join the Rocky Mountain Athletic Conference.

Conference standings

Postseason

See also
 1968 NCAA University Division football season
 1968 NCAA College Division football season

References

 
NAIA Football National Championship